Eupoecilia coniopa is a species of moth of the family Tortricidae. It is found on Borneo.

References

Eupoecilia
Moths described in 1984